Alfred Hassner  (Hebrew: אלפרד הסנר) (born 1930) is an internationally known organic chemist.

Biography
Alfred Hassner was born in Czernowitz and spent WWII in hiding while he lost his father; after the war, he returned to study in Vienna and then immigrated to the USA where he continued his studies. In 1983 he moved with his wife Cyd and two children to Israel. Hassner is currently Emeritus Professor at Bar Ilan University.

Scientific career
After a postdoctoral at Harvard University, Hassner joined the University of Colorado Boulder in 1957 where he became a full professor in 1966. In 1975 he was called to State University of New York Binghamton as Leading Professor and in 1983 he moved to Bar Ilan University in Israel. Hassner was visiting professor at Wuerzburg University, Stanford University, Weizmann Institute of Science, University of California Berkeley, University of Nijmegen, Universite Claude Bernard Lyon, Indian Institute of Science Bangalore, Kyushu Institute of Technology.

Research
Prof. Hassner’s research group has studied: Regioselective additions of pseudohalogens; Stereochemistry of reactions of azides and organic nitrogen functions; Development of catalysts like DMAP for direct esterification of hindered alcohols;  Regiochemistry of 3+2 cycloadditions and of 2+2 ketene olefin cycloadditions; Reaction of 3-member-ring iodonium ions and of nitrilium ion intermediates; Reactions of steroids; Organosilanes, Photochemical protection, Medicinal chemistry, electrophilic amination.  Hassner’s group pioneered in methodology for synthesis of small ring heterocycles such as aziridines, azirines, azetines, as well as of larger ring heterocycles including azepines. Recently they studied TiCl catalyzed reactions.

Awards
Hassner is the recipient of several awards and honors: von Humboldt Fellow; Lady Davis Fellow; Nat. Cancer Inst. Senior Fellow; Killam Award; Fulbright Fellow; Meyerhoff Fellow; Fellow Royal Society of Chemistry; Israel Chemical Society Prize of Excellence.  Hassner served on the editorial board of J. Org. Chem.; Org. Prep. Proced. International; Heterocyclic Commun.; Trends in Org. Chem. and was elected president of the Israel Chemical Society.

Publications
Hassner is the author of 320 scientific publications; he was the editor of the scientific series: Advances in Asymmetric Synthesis (JAI press); Small Ring Heterocycles (Wiley); Topics in Heterocyclic Chemistry (Springer).

Books

References

1930 births
Living people
Academic staff of Bar-Ilan University
21st-century American chemists
Israeli chemists
Jewish chemists
American emigrants to Israel
Binghamton University faculty